Kamara is a mountain village and a community in the municipal unit of Falaisia, in the southwest of Arcadia, Greece. It is situated on a mountain slope, 5 km east of Tourkolekas, 6 km west of Longanikos, 7 km northwest of Dyrrachio and 18 km south of Megalopoli. In 2011 Kamara had a population of 163 for the village and 210 for the community, which includes the village Kampochori.

Population

See also

List of settlements in Arcadia

References

External links
History and information about Kamara
 Kamara GTP Travel Pages

Falaisia
Populated places in Arcadia, Peloponnese